Ricardo Ramírez, C.S.B. (born September 12, 1936) is an American prelate of the Roman Catholic Church. Ramirez served as the first bishop of the Diocese of Las Cruces in New Mexico from 1982 to 2013.  He previously served as an auxiliary bishop of the Archdiocese of San Antonio in Texas from 1981 to 1982.

Biography

Early life 
Ricardo Ramírez was born on September 12, 1936, in Bay City, Texas, as the second of the two children of Natividad and Maria (née Espinosa) Ramírez. Up to the sixth grade, he attended a segregated school for Mexican-American students. At that time, he started working after school to help the family finances.  In 1942, Ramirez entered Jefferson Davis Grammar school in Bay City and Bay City High School in 1951, graduating in 1955. Ramírez then studied at the University of St. Thomas in Houston, where he obtained his bachelor's degree in 1959.

On September 12, 1960, Ramirez joined the Congregation of St. Basil. He spent his first six months at a so-called boot camp in Michigan, then taught English and History in schools in Los Angeles and Houston.  In 1963, Ramirez entered St. Basil's Seminary in Toronto. In 1965, he finished his studies at the Conciliar Seminary of Mexico in Mexico City.

Priesthood 
On December 10, 1966, Ramírez was ordained to the priesthood in the Congregation of St. Basil by Bishop John Morkovsky at St. Ann Catholic Church in Houston.

After his ordination, Ramirez was assigned to St. Mary's Parrish in Owen Sound, Ontario for six months. In 1967, he entered the University of Detroit, graduating in 1968, with a Master of Arts degree.  Ramirez then moved to Mexico City, where he served as chaplain to university students at the Centro Cultural Aragón. In 1970. he started working with the Family Religious Education Project in Tehuacán, Mexico, serving there until 1976. During this period, Ramírez also studied at the East Asian Pastoral Institute of Ateneo de Manila University in Manila (1973-1974).

After returning to San Antonio in 1976, Remirez was appointed as executive vice president of the Mexican American Cultural Center (now the Mexican American Catholic College) in San Antonio.

Auxiliary Bishop of San Antonio 
On October 27, 1981, Pope John Paul II appointed Ramírez as an auxiliary bishop of the Archdiocese of San Antonio and titular bishop of Vatarba. He was consecrated at the Convention Center in San Antonio on December 6, 1981, by Archbishop Patrick Flores, with Bishops Morkovsky and Rafael Ayala y Ayala serving as co-consecrators.

Bishop of Las Cruces 
On August 17, 1982, John Paul II appointed Ramírez as the first bishop of the Diocese of Las Cruces .  He was installed on October 18. 1982 at the Pan American Center in Las Cruces, New Mexico.

Ramírez had to build the new diocese, creating a small diocesan office with one manual typewriter and the diocese's tribunal; and appointing his priest councilors. Within the United States Conference of Catholic Bishops (USCCB), Ramirez sat on the International Policy Committee, the Committee on the Liturgy, and the Committee on Hispanic Affairs. He formerly chaired the Committee on the Church in Latin America and the Catholic Campaign for Human Development. He was also a member of the Advisory Committee of the Catholic Common Ground Initiative. Ramirez was appointed as a member of the US State Department's Advisory Committee on Religious Freedom Abroad.  He also served on the U.S. Commission on International Religious Freedom, traveling to China, Egypt and other parts of Africa.

Retirement 
On January 10, 2013, Ramírez's resignation as bishop of the Diocese of Las Cruces was accepted by Pope Benedict XVI, to be succeeded by Bishop Oscar Cantú. Ramirez retired in Las Cruces.

In 2016, Ramirez published his book Power from the Margins: The Emergence of the Latino in the Church and in Society.

See also
 

 Catholic Church hierarchy
 Catholic Church in the United States
 Historical list of the Catholic bishops of the United States
 List of Catholic bishops of the United States
 Lists of patriarchs, archbishops, and bishops

References

External links
Roman Catholic Diocese of Las Cruces Official Site
Catholic-Hierarchy
Diocese of Las Cruces

Episcopal succession

1936 births
Living people
People from Bay City, Texas
20th-century Roman Catholic bishops in the United States
Members of Catholic orders and societies
University of Detroit Mercy alumni
University of St. Thomas (Texas) alumni
Congregation of St. Basil
American people of Mexican descent
Catholics from Texas
21st-century Roman Catholic bishops in the United States